Petrer is a town and municipality located in the comarca of Vinalopó Mitjà, in the province of Alicante of the autonomous community of Valencia, Spain.

Petrer joins together with the city of Elda to form a conurbation with over 95,000 inhabitants. The creek Rambla dels Molins (Riverbed of the Mills), a tributary of the river Vinalopó, runs through the urban area of Petrer.

The economy of Petrer is based on the industries of footwear, furs, plastics, construction materials and pottery. The most important monuments in Petrer are the Catholic church of Sant Bartolomeu (Saint Bartholomew), the Arab castle and the hermitages of Sant Bonifaci and Christ.

The Moros i Cristians festival of Petrer attracts many tourists each year. Moros y Cristianos (Spanish: [ˈmoɾos i kɾisˈtjanos]) or Moros i Cristians (Valencian: [ˈmɔɾoz i kɾistiˈans]) literally in English Moors and Christians, is a set of festival activities which are celebrated in many towns and cities of Spain, mainly in the southern Valencian Community. According to popular tradition the festivals commemorate the battles, combats and fights between Moors (i.e. Muslims) and Christians during the period known as Reconquista (from the 8th century through the 15th century). There are also festivals of Moros y Cristianos in Spanish America.[1][2]

'Parading' Moorish ships along the beach of Villajoyosa, 2008.

The parades in Villena brings together the largest number of participants and music bands.
The festivals represent the capture of the city by the Muslims and the subsequent Christian reconquering fight. The people who take part in the festival are usually enlisted in local associations called filaes (singular filà) or comparses (companies that represent the Christian or Moor legions). The festivals last for several days, and feature festive parades with bombastic costumes loosely inspired by Medieval fashion. Christians wear fur, metallic helmets, and armor, fire loud arquebuses, and ride horses. In contrast, Moors wear ancient Arab costumes, carry scimitars, and ride real camels or elephants. The festival develops among shots of gunpowder, medieval music, and fireworks, and ends with the Christians winning a simulated battle around a castle.

Notable people 
 Isaías Guardiola, handballer
 Gedeón Guardiola, handballer
 José Justicia, professional darts player

See also 
Route of the Castles of Vinalopó

References

External links 

  
 International Guitar Festival.
 News, Pics and Videos from Petrer.

Municipalities in the Province of Alicante
Vinalopó Mitjà